Szirma is a suburban area of the city of Southeast Miskolc, Hungary, with a population of 4235 (2008). Szirma once was a village and has been part of Miskolc since 1950. Nowadays it is a peaceful and a family-friendly area with easy access to city centre.

Location 
Szirma is located at the southeast corner of Miskolc and lies on a low area between river Hejő and Sajó, near the edge of The Great Plain. It is 3 km (1.8m) away from the centre, which can be easily reached by local public transport, by bus 3. Szirma is also close to the M30 Motorway and the Park Center shopping centre.

History 
Szirma was established during the Arpad-Era and it was first mentioned in a source from 1343. In fact, the source was rather related to a person, Mark Szirmai, who lived in the settlement with his family. In 1417 the village was donated to the Szirmay Family by King Sigismund. Later in the 16th and 17th century the territory was under the rule of The Ottoman Empire. As a result of great floods, in 1674 the villagers had to leave the settlement. In the 18th century the population was still very small, there were only 72 houses in 1736. It was not until the 19th century, however, that the population began to grow. Earlier the village also had an important role in agriculture, supplying Miskolc with vegetables. Due to the area's geographical features, the garden suburb has excellent flat lands for cultivation. In 1950 Szirma was annexed to the city of Miskolc.

Manor-house
Around 1902–1903, an ornate manor house, the so-called Klein-Castle, was constructed by two famous architect, Béla Lajta and Ödön Lechner. The monument was built in Art Nouveau style, which then belonged to the landowner, Mor Klein and his son Sandor Klein. The lexicons which were published during interwar period mention the manor-house was also home to a significant artwork collection. Unfortunately the building was destroyed during the Second World War in 1944.

Religious sites
Szirma has four churches:  
 Roman Catholic Church
 Saint Andrew Greek Catholic Church
 Reformed Church
 House of Prayer Baptist Church

Education
Szirma has a kindergarten and a  primary school, The Reformed Primary School of Miskolc-Szirma (formerly Bem József Primary School). The institution was built in the mid 1900s and has been recently renovated and renamed.

See also
 Miskolc

References

Miskolc
Former municipalities of Hungary